The Spanish Civil War, fought between 1936–1939, provided an opportunity for many European countries to evaluate new technologies and tactics, including armored warfare. At the beginning of the war, the Nationalist and Popular Fronts each possessed only five World War I-era-design Renault FT light tanks, although these were soon reinforced with imported materiel. Italy began supplying Nationalist Spain with L3/35 tankettes in August 1936. The Soviet Union soon followed suit by supplying the Popular Front with T-26 light tanks in October 1936. Germany sent its first shipments of Panzer I light tanks to the Nationalist Front in September 1936. During the war, France and Poland provided the Popular Front with a number of additional FT light tanks. A considerable number of tanks delivered to the Popular Front were subsequently captured; many of these were put into service against their former owners.

The Nationalist and Popular armies also designed and manufactured a number of their own tanks. The Nationalists, for example, began the war with three Trubia A4 prototypes, manufactured before the beginning of the conflict. They also completed the first prototype of the Verdeja light tank. This was designed to overcome the shortcomings of tanks provided by the Germans and the Italians, as well as Soviet tanks captured from the Popular Front. Popular Front production of armored vehicles was segmented throughout different areas of Spain. In the north, between 15 and 20 Carro Trubia-Naval tanks were manufactured at the factory in Sestao, conversely the Trubia factory had built only a single model Landesa tank. In Catalonia, two tanks were produced by the Maquinaría Moderna factory in Sant Sadurní d'Anoia. Though the Popular Front designed and manufactured many more armored fighting vehicles than the Nationalists, this ultimately worked in the Nationalists favor as the factories and their production lines were captured intact during the war.

Tanks in service at the beginning

Manufactured in Spain

Produced and deployed by the Nationalists

Produced and deployed by the Popular Front

Tanks supplied by foreign powers

Tanks captured by the Nationalists

Notes

References

 
 

 
 
 
 

Civil War
Spanish Civil War-related lists